Bell is a village 30 km south-east of Peddie and 80 km south-west of East London. Named after Charles Davidson Bell (1813-1882), Surveyor-General in 1857.

References

Populated places in the Ngqushwa Local Municipality